Abderrazak Chahat (born 14 January 1962) is a Tunisian former footballer. He competed in the men's tournament at the 1988 Summer Olympics.

References

External links
 
 

1962 births
Living people
Tunisian footballers
Tunisia international footballers
Olympic footballers of Tunisia
Footballers at the 1988 Summer Olympics
Place of birth missing (living people)
Association football defenders
Club Africain players